Carlos Henrique de Moura Brito (born 3 July 1992), simply known as Carlão, is a Brazilian professional footballer who plays as a forward for Noroeste.

Career
Carlão previously played for Associação Desportiva São Caetano, where he was the club's top goal scorer (10) as it won the 2017 Campeonato Paulista Série A2, the club's first title in 13 years. He continued his stay with São Caetano in 2018, as they competed in the Campeonato Paulista.

In 2019, Carlão moved to Saudi Arabia where he led Al-Jabalain FC in goal-scoring for two Saudi First Division League seasons. He joined rivals Al-Qadsiah FC in July 2021. On 30 July 2022, Carlão joined former club Al-Jabalain. On 4 January 2023, Carlão and Al-Jabalain agreed to end the contract mutually.

On 12 January 2023, Carlão joined Noroeste.

References

External links
 

1992 births
Living people
People from Ribeirão Preto
Brazilian footballers
Footballers from São Paulo (state)
Association football forwards
Paulista Futebol Clube players
Clube Atlético Sorocaba players
Clube de Regatas Brasil players
Capivariano Futebol Clube players
Botafogo Futebol Clube (SP) players
Paraná Clube players
Associação Desportiva São Caetano players
Sampaio Corrêa Futebol Clube players
Mirassol Futebol Clube players
Grêmio Novorizontino players
Al-Jabalain FC players
Al-Qadsiah FC players
Esporte Clube Noroeste players
Campeonato Brasileiro Série B players
Campeonato Brasileiro Série C players
Campeonato Brasileiro Série D players
Saudi First Division League players
Brazilian expatriate footballers
Brazilian expatriate sportspeople in Saudi Arabia
Expatriate footballers in Saudi Arabia